Antonio José Muñoz y Valcárcel (born 19 November 1958), commonly known as Kitín Muñoz, is a Spanish adventurer, scientist and former commando. He was appointed as a UNESCO Goodwill Ambassador in 1997.

Life and career
Inspired by Thor Heyerdahl, Muñoz made three attempts to cross the Pacific Ocean, two of which failed, and one failed attempt to cross the Atlantic Ocean to prove that ancient seafarers sailing in reed boats could have crossed the oceans before the European expeditions of the 15th century.

Muñoz is also a former member of the Spanish Army special forces (the Mando de Operaciones Especiales), and an honorary consul of Morocco.

Marriage
On 26 October 2002, Muñoz married Princess Kalina of Bulgaria, Duchess of Saxe, Countess of Murány, only daughter of Simeon II of Bulgaria. The royal wedding was the subject of a television documentary.

Their son, Simeon Hassan Muñoz, was born on 14 March 2007 in Sofia, Bulgaria. In 2015, Muñoz, Kalina, and their son were living near Rabat, in Morocco.

See also
The Viracocha expedition

References

Kitin Muñoz sets out for a new maritime challenge Information on "Mata Rangi III" expedition
Kitín Muñoz, un aventurero en los mares del sur Information on the "Uru" expedition in Spanish
Kitín Muñoz mini-bio in Spanish
Obituary of his father in Spanish
Obituario of his mother in Spanish

External links
Kitín Muñoz – UNESCO Goodwill Ambassador

1958 births
Living people
House of Saxe-Coburg and Gotha (Bulgaria)
Spanish explorers
Spanish scientists
Spanish sociologists
Spanish anthropologists
Spanish navigators
UNESCO Goodwill Ambassadors